Christine Stark (born May 8, 1970 in Winnipeg, Manitoba) is a retired female volleyball player from Canada.

Stark competed for her native country at the 1996 Summer Olympics in Atlanta, Georgia. There the resident of St. François Xavier, Manitoba finished in 10th place with the Women's National Team.

References
Canadian Olympic Committee

1970 births
Canadian women's volleyball players
Living people
Olympic volleyball players of Canada
Volleyball players from Winnipeg
Volleyball players at the 1996 Summer Olympics
Pan American Games medalists in volleyball
Pan American Games bronze medalists for Canada
Medalists at the 1995 Pan American Games